Zech logarithms are used to implement addition in finite fields when elements are represented as powers of a generator .

Zech logarithms are named after Julius Zech, and are also called Jacobi logarithms, after Carl G. J. Jacobi who used them for number theoretic investigations.

Definition
Given a primitive element  of a finite field, the Zech logarithm relative to the base  is defined by the equation

which is often rewritten as

The choice of base  is usually dropped from the notation when it is clear from the context.

In order to describe every element, it is convenient to formally add a new symbol , along with the definitions

 

Using the Zech logarithm, finite field arithmetic can be done in the exponential representation:

In particular, the addition and subtraction formulas need to treat  as a special case.

This can be extended to arithmetic of the projective line by introducing another symbol  satisfying  and other rules as appropriate.

For fields of characteristic two,
.

Uses
For sufficiently small finite fields, a table of Zech logarithms allows an especially efficient implementation of  all finite field arithmetic in terms of a small number of integer addition/subtractions and table look-ups.

The utility of this method diminishes for large fields where one cannot efficiently store the table. This method is also inefficient when doing very few operations in the finite field, because one spends more time computing the table than one does in actual calculation.

Examples

Let  be a root of the primitive polynomial .  The traditional representation of elements of this field is as polynomials in α of degree 2 or less.

The multiplicative order of α is 7, so the exponential representation works with integers modulo 7.

Since α is a root of  then that means , or if we recall that since all coefficients are in GF(2), subtraction is the same as addition, we obtain .

The conversion from exponential to polynomial representations is given by
 (as shown above)

Using Zech logarithms to compute :
,
or, more efficiently,
,
and verifying it in the polynomial representation:
.

See also
 Gaussian logarithm
 Irish logarithm, a similar technique derived empirically by Percy Ludgate
 Finite field arithmetic
 Logarithm table

References

Further reading
 
 
    
 

Linear algebra
Finite fields